The following is a list of Burmese actors.

Actors

A
Aung Lwin
A Linn Yaung
Aung Min Khant
Aung Yay Chan

D
Dwe
Daung

H
Hein Htet

K
Kyaw Hein
Kyaw Swe
Khin Maung Yin
Kyaw Thu
Kyaw Ye Aung
Khar Ra
Kyaw Htet Zaw
Kyaw Htet Aung
Kaung Myat San
Kyaw Hsu
Khin Hlaing
Ko ko oo

L
Lu min
Lwin Moe
Lin Aung Khit

M
Moe Aung Yin
Myint Aung
Min Maw Kun
Myint Myat
Min Thway

N
Nay Htoo Naing
Nay Toe
Nyi Pu
Nyein Thaw
Nat Khat

O
Okkar Min Maung

P
Po Par Gyi
Pyay Ti Oo
Paing Takhon

S
Sai Sai Kham Leng
Shwe Htoo
Shwe Yoe
Soe Thu
Si Phyo
Si Thu Win

T
Thu Maung
Tyron Bejay
Tun Tun

W
Wai Lu Kyaw
Win Oo

Y
Yaza Ne Win
Ye Lay
Yan Aung

Z
Zaganar
Zaw One
Zeya
Zwe Pyae
Zin Wine

Actresses

A
Aye Myat Thu
Aye Wutyi Thaung
Aye Mya Phyu

C
Chit Thu Wai
Cho Pyone
Chue Lay
Chaw Yadanar

E
Eaindra Kyaw Zin
Ei Chaw Po

H
Htun Eaindra Bo
Htet Htet Moe Oo
Hsaung Wutyee May
Htar Htet Htet

K
Khin Than Nu
Khin Yu May
Kyi Kyi Htay
Khine Thin Kyi
Khine Hnin Wai
Khin Wint Wah
Khay Sett Thwin
Khin Moht Moht Aye
Khin Zarchi Kyaw

M
May
May Myat Noe
May Shin
May May Win
May Sweet
May Win Maung
Melody
Moh Moh Myint Aung
Moe Yu San
Myint Myint Khin
May Than Nu
May Thet Khine
May Toe Khine
May Myint Mo
Mya Hnin Yee Lwin
May Mi Ko Ko
Mone
Myat Thu Thu
Moe Hay Ko

N
Nandar Hlaing
Nay Chi Oo
Nan Sandar Hla Htun
Nay Chi Shoon Lak
Nansu Yati Soe

P
Phway Phway
Paing Phyo Thu
Pyae Pyae
Poe Kyar Phyu Khin
Poe Ei Ei Khant

S
Soe Myat Thuzar
Soe Myat Nandar
Su Pan Htwar
Su Shun Lae
Soe Pyae Thazin
Shwe Hmone Yati
Shwe Thamee

T
Thet Mon Myint
Thandar Bo
Thinzar Wint Kyaw
Than Thar Moe Theint
Thun Sett

W
Wah Wah Win Shwe
Wutt Hmone Shwe Yi
Wyne Su Khine Thein
Wint Yamone Naing

Y
Yoon Yoon
Yu Thandar Tin
Yadanar My
Yadanar Bo
Yadanar Phyu Phyu Aung

Lists of actors by nationality
Actors